Bolla is a given name and surname. Notable people with the name include:

Given name
Bolla Bulli Ramaiah (1926–2018), Indian politician
Bolla Conradie (born 1978), South African rugby union footballer

Surname
Bendegúz Bolla (born 1999), Hungarian footballer 
Giovanni Bolla (1650 - 1735), Italian painter
Jim Bolla (1952–2022), American basketball coach
R. Bolla or Robert Kerman (1947–2018), American actor
Sophie Farkas Bolla, Canadian film editor
Srikanth Bolla (born 1991), Indian industrialist 
Vittorio Bolla (1932–2002), Italian ice hockey player

See also
Bola (name), given name and surname
Mark DeBolla (born 1983), English footballer